Donald Francis Hanchon (born October 9, 1947), is an American prelate of the Roman Catholic Church who served as an auxiliary bishop for the Archdiocese of Detroit.

Biography

Early life 
Donald Hanchon was born in Jackson, Michigan, on October 9, 1947, to John Michael and Alfreda (Glinicki) Hanchon, the middle of seven children. He is of Polish descent. Hanchon went to St. Mary's Grade School in Wayne, Michigan and then Sacred Heart Seminary in Detroit.  In 1961, he entered Cardinal Mooney Latin School in Detroit.

Hanchon graduated in 1969 from Sacred Heart Seminary, then entered St. John's Provincial Seminary in Plymouth, Michigan, earning a Bachelor of Arts degree in 1971.  He was awarded a Master of Theology degree from the University of Detroit Mercy in 1972 and a Master of Liturgy degree from the University of Notre Dame in Notre Dame, Indianan, in 1974.

Priesthood 
Hanchon was ordained a priest by Cardinal John Dearden of the Archdiocese of Detroit on October 19, 1974. After his ordination, Hanchon served as associate pastor at Blessed Sacrament Cathedral Parish and at St. Mark Parish in Warren, Michigan. He also served as associate spiritual director at Sacred Heart Seminary and, between 1981 and 1986, as director of vocations for the archdiocese.

In 1986, Hanchon spent a year studying Spanish and Mexican culture in Mexico and at the Mexican American Cultural Center run by the Catholic Church in San Antonio, Texas. After returning to Detroit in 1987, he served as pastor in St. Joseph Parish in Monroe, Michigan for the next five years. Hanchon was transferred in 1992 to become pastor of St. Gabriel Parish in Detroit, serving there until 1999.  Also in 1992, he was appointed coordinator for the archdiocesan Pastoral Plan for Hispanic Ministry.

In 1999, Hanchon was named pastor of Most Holy Redeemer Parish in Detroit, a position he continued to hold after becoming bishop. In 2009, he was appointed as episcopal vicar and regional moderator of the Central Region, which includes Detroit, Hamtramck, Michigan and Highland Park, Michigan.

Auxiliary Bishop of Detroit
Hanchon was appointed as the titular bishop of Horreomargum and an auxiliary bishop for the Archdiocese of Detroit on March 22, 2011, by Pope Benedict XVI. He was consecrated by Archbishop Allen H. Vigneron on May 5, 2011. Hanchon has been a member of the Jesus-Caritas Fraternity of Priests since 1975 and has served as an officer of the brotherhood.

On March 3, 2023, Pope Francis accepted his retirement.

See also

Roman Catholic Archdiocese of Detroit
 Catholic Church hierarchy
 Catholic Church in the United States
 Historical list of the Catholic bishops of the United States
 List of Catholic bishops of the United States
 Lists of patriarchs, archbishops, and bishops

References

External links
Roman Catholic Archdiocese of Detroit Official Site
Catholic-Hierarchy

Episcopal succession
 

 

1947 births
People from Jackson, Michigan
20th-century American Roman Catholic priests
21st-century American Roman Catholic titular bishops
Living people
American people of Polish descent
Roman Catholic Archdiocese of Detroit
Religious leaders from Michigan
Catholics from Michigan